This is a list of museums in Zambia.

List 
 Choma Museum and Crafts Project
 Chilenje House 394
 Copperbelt Museum
 Livingstone Museum
 Lusaka National Museum
 Moto Moto Museum
 Nayuma Museum
 Railway Museum
 Victoria Falls Field Museum

See also 
 List of museums

External links 
 Museums in Zambia

 
Zambia
Museums
Museums
Museums
Zambia